Aphyonus is a genus of blind cusk eels from the family Aphyonidae. It contains four species. A sampling of specimens of Aphyonus showed that the type species of Aphyonus, A. gelatinosus, was not closely related to the other known species in the genus, and a new genus Paraphyonus was named for these, including two newly identified species. The result of this classification is that Aphyonus would be a monotypic genus.

Species
The four species of Aphyonus are:

 Aphyonus bolini Nielsen, 1974
 Aphyonus brevidorsalis Nielsen, 1969
 Aphyonus gelatinosus Günther, 1878
 Aphyonus rassi Nielsen, 1975

References

Aphyonidae
Ray-finned fish genera
Taxa named by Albert Günther